Sphingomonas astaxanthinifaciens  is a bacterium from the genus of Sphingomonas which has been isolated from fresh water in Misasa in Japan. Sphingomonas astaxanthinifaciens has the ability to produce astaxanthin.

References

Further reading

External links
Type strain of Sphingomonas astaxanthinifaciens at BacDive -  the Bacterial Diversity Metadatabase	

astaxanthinifaciens
Bacteria described in 2008